Paramiopsalis is a genus of harvestmen belonging to the family Sironidae.

The species of this genus are found in Spain.

Species:

Paramiopsalis anadonae 
Paramiopsalis ramblae 
Paramiopsalis ramulosus

References

Harvestmen